Ruth Miriam Siems (February 20, 1931 – November 13, 2005) was the home economist who created Stove Top Stuffing.

A native of Evansville, Indiana, she developed the stuffing, one of General Foods Corp.'s (now Kraft Foods Inc.) top convenience products, in 1971 while working at the corporation's Tarrytown, New York facility.

Her name was the first on a patent application for the product.  Her patent was based on a certain size of bread crumb that makes the rehydration, or addition of water, work. In an interview with The Evansville Courier in 1991, Siems said the idea for the instant stuffing came from the marketing department, but it was up to the research and development staff to create the product.  The test kitchens, the chefs and all the workers in research and development were given a shot at developing the stuffing, but Siems' idea was the one the company chose. Today, Kraft Foods, which now owns the brand, sells about 60 million boxes of it at Thanksgiving, a company spokeswoman said. Some sources say that Siems first sold the recipe to the Mrs Cubbison's corporation, and that later she further developed it for wholesale purposes in the General Foods Kitchen.

Siems graduated from Bosse High School in Evansville and earned a degree in home economics from Purdue University in 1953.  She was employed for almost four years in product research and development at the old Igleheart Brothers plant of General Foods in Evansville, working on quality control for angel food cake mixes and researching the Swans Down brand of cake mixes and flours. She retired from General Foods Inc. in 1985 after a 33½-year career.

"Everyone always had me pegged as a creative person," she said in a newspaper interview. "I've always liked to put things together."

Siems died in Newburgh, Indiana, after suffering a heart attack at her home.

References 

1931 births
2005 deaths
People from Evansville, Indiana
Purdue University College of Health and Human Sciences alumni
Home economists
Kraft Foods people